Drayton, Norfolk, is a suburban village in the English county of Norfolk. Today, Drayton is largely dominated by the Thorpe Marriott housing estate built in the late Twentieth Century.

History
Drayton's name is of Anglo-Saxon origin and derives from the Old English for a farmstead or settlement where logs were dragged.

In the early Twentieth Century, several Roman artefacts including coins and pottery were unearthed close to the village with a further Anglo-Saxon cemetery being discovered on the banks of the nearby River Wensum. The cemetery has yielded Anglo-Saxon brooches, daggers and pottery.

In the Domesday Book, Drayton is listed as a settlement of ten households in the hundred of Taverham. In 1086, the village was part of the estates of Ralph de Beaufour.

Throughout the mid-Fifteenth Century, Drayton was part of the estates of Sir John Fastolf, a prominent English soldier in the Hundred Years War and the basis of Shakespeare's Sir John Falstaff. Fastolf built Drayton Lodge in 1437 as a fortification overlooking the Wensum. By the time of Falstolf's death in 1459, his estates passed into the hands of John Paston which was fiercely contested by John de la Pole, Duke of Suffolk whose estates consisted of the neighbouring village of Costessey. The clashes resulting from the dispute are documented in the Paston Letters. Though Drayton Lodge was partly demolished in 1465, the ruins are still visible today.

To the west of Drayton is a rare example of a private fallout shelter built to Government specification during the Cold War.

Geography
During the 2011 Census, Drayton was recorded as two wards. Drayton North has a population of 3,102 people residents in 1,288 households whilst Drayton South has a population of 2,387 residents living in 1,039 households.

Drayton falls within the constituency of Norwich North and is represented at Parliament by Chloe Smith MP of the Conservative Party. For the purposes of local government, the parish falls within the district of Broadland.

St. Margaret's Church
Drayton's parish church is dedicated to Saint Margaret and is of uncertain Medieval origin. St. Margaret's was heavily remodelled in the Nineteenth Century, a process made necessary by the church tower collapsing into the nave in 1850. The church displays good examples of Continental stained glass depicting Anna the Prophetess, Saint Mary and Saint Elizabeth.

Amenities
Drayton has a petrol station (all night), Barclays Bank, estate agent, two post offices, butcher, doctors’ surgery and late night pharmacy, Lloyd's chemist, a Dental practice, baker, patisserie, florist, four hairdressers, beautician, dress shop, two industrial estates and several public houses including the Cock Inn and the Red Lion, and Stower Grange hotel and restaurant. It also has three Tesco outlets.

The village also has the Longdale and King George V playing fields, the Bob Carter Sports and Community Centre and an insurance broker (Drayton Insurance). Drayton also has Low Road Potato Farm which serves the local community and businesses with potatoes and vegetables. R G Carter construction and farms' businesses are located here. Furthermore, nearby Thorpe Marriott has its own shopping centre at Acres Way, including a fish shop, mini Tesco, the Otter public house and an estate agent.

Drayton has two schools, Drayton Community Infant School for children aged 4 to 6 which was given a 'Requires Improvement' rating by Ofsted in 2022 and Drayton Church of England Junior School for children aged 6 to 11 which was rated as 'Good' in 2013.

Thorpe Marriott is served by Trinity Ecumenical Church (Methodist & Anglican) and by St Margaret's Drayton and St Edmund's Taverham, partner churches with local Methodists in the Trinity LEP (Local Ecumenical Partnership). St Margaret's, together with Drayton Methodist and Trinity Church  are members of 'Churches Together in Drayton, Taverham & Thorpe Marriott'.

Transport
Drayton railway station opened in 1882 as a stop on the Midland and Great Northern Joint Railway route between Melton Constable and Norwich. The station was closed in 1959 and today the route forms part of Marriott's Way, the long-distance foot and cyclepath between Norwich and Aylsham.

Notable Residents
 Cpt. Harry Cator VC (1894-1966)- British soldier, civil servant and recipient of the Victoria Cross

War Memorial
Drayton's war memorial takes the form of a carved stone plaque inside St. Margaret's Church. The memorial lists the following names for the First World War:
 Lieutenant Samuel S. Wainwright (1890-1917), 6th Battalion, Royal Norfolk Regiment
 Private Cyril P. Steward (1893-1918), 16th Battalion, Army Cyclist Corps
 Private Ben Stevenson (d.1917), 4th Battalion, Bedfordshire Regiment
 Private Charles E. Stevenson (d.1917), 13th Battalion, Royal Sussex Regiment
 F. W. Bailey
 T. E. Barrett
 J. W. Clarke
 C. H. Warnes
 W. H. Waters

And, the following for the Second World War:
 Major John C. Bunting (1910-1944), Royal Artillery
 Captain Ernest L. Wilson (d.1939), Royal Army Service Corps
 Sergeant Basil V. Clinton (1923-1945), No. 247 Squadron RAF
 Able-Seaman Harry A. G. Holman (1919-1942), HMS Curacoa
 Corporal Charles S. Gould (1920-1944), Royal Norfolk Regiment
 Lance-Corporal Godfrey G. Alderton (1917-1942), 6th Battalion, Royal Norfolk Regiment
 Driver Arthur W. Chambers (1918-1944), Royal Army Service Corps
 Ordinary-Seaman Kenneth J. Pratt (1925-1943), HMS Tynedale
 Private George E. Ruddock (1924-1944), 5th Battalion, Royal Norfolk Regiment
 Private Harold G. Carman (1915-1945), 6th Battalion, Royal Norfolk Regiment
 Private Leonard Stevenson (1923-1944), 6th Battalion, Parachute Regiment
 A. J. Foster
 W. Symonds

St. Margaret's also holds a memorial for the three civilian war dead likely killed during the Norwich Blitz of the Second World War. They are listed as Thomas H. Bell (1917-1941), R. H. Clarke and S. G. Fox.

References

External links

 Just Drayton

Broadland
Villages in Norfolk
Civil parishes in Norfolk